The 2021–22 Gardner–Webb Runnin' Bulldogs men's basketball team represented Gardner–Webb University in the 2021–22 NCAA Division I men's basketball season. The Runnin' Bulldogs, led by ninth-year head coach Tim Craft, played their home games at Paul Porter Arena in Boiling Springs, North Carolina as members of the Big South Conference. With the reintroduction of divisions for the first time since the 2013–14 season, the Bulldogs played in the South division. They finished the season 18–13, 11–5 in Big South play to finish second place in the South division. As the No. 3 seed in the Big South tournament, they defeated Campbell in the quarterfinals before losing to Winthrop in the semifinals.

Previous season
In a season limited due to the ongoing COVID-19 pandemic, the Runnin' Bulldogs finished the 2020–21 season 11–15, 10–10 in Big South play to finish in a three-way tie for fifth place. They were defeated by Campbell in the quarterfinals of the Big South tournament.

Roster

Schedule and results

|-
!colspan=12 style=| Non-conference regular season

|-
!colspan=12 style=| Big South regular season

|-
!colspan=9 style=| Big South tournament

Source

References

Gardner–Webb Runnin' Bulldogs men's basketball seasons
Gardner-Webb Runnin' Bulldogs
Gardner-Webb Runnin' Bulldogs men's basketball
Gardner-Webb Runnin' Bulldogs men's basketball